Boletus pseudopinophilus is a species of porcini-like fungus native to eastern North America, where it grows under Pinus elliottii and Pinus palustris. Previously regarded as Boletus pinophilus it was found to have diverged significantly from the latter species.

References

pseudopinophilus
Fungi of North America
Edible fungi
Fungi described in 2019